Frederick Barker may refer to:

Frederic Barker (1808–1882), bishop of Sydney
Frederick Eustace Barker (1838–1915), Canadian lawyer, judge and politician
Fred Barker (1901–1935), American criminal
Fred Barker (footballer) (1903–1974), Australian rules footballer

See also